Baiyin Nonferrous Group Co., Ltd. known also as BNMC is a Chinese company based in Baiyin, Gansu Province, China. The company was the main copper supplier in China.

Since 15 February 2017, Baiyin Nonferrous is a listed company in the Shanghai Stock Exchange. In 2017, the localized version of Fortune ranked Baiyin Nonferrous as the 116th of top 500 Chinese enterprises.

History
The predecessor of the company was established in 1954, as one of the industrial project of the First Five Year Plan. It was the main copper supplier in China, however, the mining pit opened in 1956 was shut down in 1988. The city of Baiyin was declared by the government as “resource exhaustion”. As of 2016, the company rely on investment in China, South Africa, Peru, DR Congo and the Philippines.

Shareholders

Footnotes

References

External links
 

Metal companies of China
CITIC Group
Companies listed on the Shanghai Stock Exchange
Baiyin
Chinese companies established in 2008
Government-owned companies of China
Companies owned by the provincial government of China
Companies based in Gansu
China Orient Asset Management